Keegan Smith (born 13 May 1999) is a New Zealand footballer who plays as a goalkeeper for National Premier Leagues Tasmania club Devonport City.

Club career

A-League
Smith joined Wellington Phoenix to play for their reserves playing in New Zealand's top-flight, the ISPS Handa Premiership. Smith made his debut starting in a game against Canterbury United. He made his senior league debut in the A-League on 8 October 2017, in a 1–1 draw with Adelaide United.

On 9 November 2017, Smith was rewarded for his breakthrough with a three-year contract with the Wellington Phoenix. As the Phoenix had already reached their limit of 23 professional players, Smith's first two years were on a full-time scholarship deal before his third year turned professional.

Domestic career
In May 2018, Smith was allowed to link up with Phoenix feeder club, Lower Hutt, in New Zealand's top league, to get game time with the plan for him to return for Year 2 of his contract. During this time, Smith continued to train with the Phoenix despite playing matches with Lower Hutt. 

In October 2018, it was announced that Smith and the Phoenix had agreed to a mutual termination that allowed Smith to leave the club and join Tasman United to play in the ISPS Handa Premiership.

Over the 2019 and 2020 seasons, Smith would play for several Wellington sides in the ISPS Handa Premiership and Central League (New Zealand first-tier in the summer and winter respectively). These clubs are Wellington Olympic, Team Wellington, Miramar Rangers and North Wellington.

Return to Australian leagues

In November 2021, it was announced that Smith would be returning to Australia to play in the  National Premier Leagues, signing for Tasmania champions and FFA Cup regulars Devonport City. He will link up with the side in February 2022 at the conclusion of the 2021 New Zealand National League season.

References

External links
Keegan Smith profile on Wellington Phoenix website.

1999 births
Living people
Association footballers from Auckland
Association football goalkeepers
New Zealand association footballers
Wellington Phoenix FC players
A-League Men players
People educated at Scots College, Wellington